The 1993–94 British Collegiate American Football League season was the ninth full season of the BCAFL, organised by the British Students American Football Association (BSAFA, now the BAFA).

Division Changes
There were no changes to the Divisional setup.

Team Changes
There were no team changes, meaning the BCAFL stayed at 26 teams.

Regular season

Northern Conference

Southern Conference

Playoffs

Note 1 – After Overtime; Glasgow and Leeds advanced as they were the higher-seeded teams.
Note 2 – the table does not indicate who played home or away in each fixture.

References

External links
 Official BUAFL Website
 Official BAFA Website

1993
1993 in British sport
1994 in British sport
1993 in American football
1994 in American football